Paolo Lorenzi was the defending champion but chose not to defend his title.

Facundo Bagnis won the title after defeating Caio Zampieri 6–7(3–7), 7–5, 6–2 in the final.

Seeds

Draw

Finals

Top half

Bottom half

References
 Main Draw
 Qualifying Draw

Seguros Bolivar Open Medellin - Singles
2016 Singles